San Jacinto may refer to:

Military
 Battle of San Jacinto, an 1836 battle between Mexico and Texas
 Battle of San Jacinto (1856), between Nicaraguans under José Dolores Estrada and American filibusters
 Battle of San Jacinto (1899), between the United States and Philippine insurgents
 San Jacinto Ordnance Depot, a US Army ammunition depot
 SS San Jacinto (1903), a commercial passenger-cargo ship under United States Army charter during World War I
 USS San Jacinto (1850), an early screw frigate of the navy
 USS San Jacinto (CVL-30), a light aircraft carrier that saw action in the latter half of World War II
 USS San Jacinto (CG-56), a guided missile cruiser commissioned in 1988

Places

United States
 San Jacinto, California
 San Jacinto Canyon, former name of Railroad Canyon, California
 San Jacinto Mountains, California
 San Jacinto Peak, California
 San Jacinto River (California)
 San Jacinto Fault Zone, a Southern Californian fault zone
 San Jacinto Valley, California
 San Jacinto, Indiana
 San Jacinto, Nevada
 San Jacinto Monument, Texas
 San Jacinto Plaza, El Paso, Texas
 San Jacinto College, Texas
 San Jacinto County, Texas
 San Jacinto River (Texas)

Other countries
 San Jacinto, Bolívar, Colombia
 San Jacinto del Cauca, Bolívar, Colombia
 San Jacinto, Chiquimula, Guatemala
 San Jacinto, Comondú, Mexico
 San Jacinto, Lerdo, Mexico
 San Jacinto Amilpas, Oaxaca, Mexico
 San Jacinto Tlacotepec, Oaxaca, Mexico
 San Jacinto, Ancash, Peru
 San Jacinto, Masbate, Philippines
 San Jacinto, Pangasinan, Philippines
 San Jacinto, Uruguay

Religion
 Hyacinth and Protus, Christian martyrs
 Jacinto Casteñeda of the Vietnamese Martyrs

Other uses
 "San Jacinto", a 1982 song by Peter Gabriel from Peter Gabriel
 San Jacinto Day, a Texas state holiday
 San Jacinto High School (disambiguation)
 USS San Jacinto, a list of ships of the United States Navy

See also
 St. Hyacinth (disambiguation)